Raphael Lukas Sallinger (born 8 December 1995) is an Austrian professional footballer who plays as a goalkeeper for Austrian Football Bundesliga club TSV Hartberg.

Club career
He made his Austrian Football Bundesliga debut for Wolfsberger AC on 29 April 2017 in a game against SV Mattersburg.

References

External links
 

1995 births
Sportspeople from Klagenfurt
Footballers from Carinthia (state)
Living people
Austrian footballers
Austria youth international footballers
Wolfsberger AC players
1. FC Kaiserslautern II players
Austrian expatriate footballers
Expatriate footballers in Germany
1. FC Kaiserslautern players
TSV Hartberg players
Austrian Football Bundesliga players
Austrian expatriate sportspeople in Germany
Association football goalkeepers